The 56 Group Wales is an artists' organisation founded in Wales in 1956, with the aim of promoting Welsh Modernist art and artists. The name was originally simply the 56 Group: "Wales" was added in 1967, in response to a feeling that the organisation's "Welsh origins ought to be re-affirmed". The Welsh-language version of the name was first used on publicity in 1976.

Formation
The post-war art establishment in Wales was still very conservative and moves had been afoot since the late 1930s to create a modern art group. In March 1956, following a failed attempt to become a South Wales Academy of Art, a "rebellion" took place within the ranks of the South Wales Group and the 56 Group was established. Artists Eric Malthouse, David Tinker and Michael Edmonds were the leading instigators. They circulated a statement of purpose and aims and an invitation to join the group to ten leading Welsh artists.

Of those invited to join, nine accepted: Trevor Bates, Hubert Dalwood, George Fairley, Arthur Giardelli, Robert Hunter, Heinz Koppel, Will Roberts, John Wright and Ernest Zobole. Brenda Chamberlain, the only female artist invited, declined.

Although all twelve of the founder-members worked in a broadly modernist and internationalist idiom, they did not share a recognisably common style or ideology. Their average age was 36; and ten worked as art lecturers (Roberts and Edmonds did not). Only two, Roberts and Zobole, had been born in Wales: Fairley was born in Scotland, Koppel in Germany and the others in England.

Activities
The 56 Group has always been essentially an exhibiting association of artists who retain their own independence and individuality. The group's first exhibition was held at Worcester Museum and Art Gallery in June 1957, and versions of the same exhibition were held later the same year at the National Museum of Wales and Tenby Civic Centre. It subsequently exhibited widely in both Wales and England. Its first continental exhibition was held in Amsterdam in 1967, and later exhibitions went to Nantes in 1974–5, Bologna in 1983, Czechoslovakia in 1986–7 and again in 1991, and Libramont, Belgium, in 1994. An exhibition of modern Welsh art held at the Jefferson Place Gallery, Washington, D.C. in 1965, although not formally associated with the Group, included work by several of its members. By 2012, the Group's 56th anniversary year, it could claim to have had a total of 88 full members (plus a number of guest, associate and honorary members); and to have held 225 exhibition showings.

Painter, sculptor and teacher Arthur Giardelli was the chair of the Group from 1961 to 1998. Some of its success – exhibitions and tours outside Wales – have been attributed to his language skills and European outlook.

In 2012, marking the 56th anniversary of the group's formation, a touring exhibition visited galleries around Wales. Called The 56 Group Wales: The Founders, it includes artworks of the twelve original founders, as well as work from current members. For the previous ten years, businessman Barrie Maskell had spent time tracking down and purchasing work made by each of the twelve original members. This included a visit to one of the surviving founders, John Wright, who was living in Spain. Fifty-six of Maskell's paintings were chosen for the exhibition. The exhibition was shown at venues in Pontypridd, Cardiff and MOMA Wales in Machynlleth. In the same year, a history of the Group's first 56 years by David Moore was published.

In January 2013 a touring exhibition of the group's work, 56:56, opened at Newport Art Gallery.

Criticism
The Group's activities have not always been eulogised. Will Roberts, one of the founder members, who was afterwards (in 1964) asked to withdraw from exhibitions because his work was seen as insufficiently radical, later dismissed the Group as having been "set up by art school teachers who wanted to sell their work". When Rollo Charles, keeper of art at the National Museum of Wales, commented in 1976 that the Group "is now generally regarded as the official avant garde of Welsh art", critic Bryn Richards responded "[t]his must seem to those who founded the group, with such hope, as a veritable kiss of death". Renowned Welsh artist Kyffin Williams was reported in 1981 to have had a strong antipathy for what he described as a group of "predominantly abstract painters or English carpetbaggers, ... who came down to Wales because they could not make it in the metropolis. The 56 Group has taken over Welsh art, and he [Williams] is out of favour in his homeland as a result."

Notable members
Wikipedia articles are available on the following members and ex-members:

Publications

Notes

References

Further reading

Welsh art
Welsh artist groups and collectives
Arts organizations established in 1956
1956 establishments in Wales
Welsh contemporary art